In commutative algebra, an element b of a commutative ring B is said to be integral over A, a subring of B, if there are n ≥ 1 and aj in A such that

That is to say, b is a root of a monic polynomial over A. The set of elements of B that are integral over A is called the integral closure of A in B. It is a subring of B containing A. If every element of B is integral over A, then we say that B is integral over A, or equivalently B is an integral extension of A.

If A, B are fields, then the notions of "integral over" and of an "integral extension" are precisely "algebraic over" and "algebraic extensions" in field theory (since the root of any polynomial is the root of a monic polynomial).

The case of greatest interest in number theory is that of complex numbers integral over Z (e.g.,  or ); in this context, the integral elements are usually called algebraic integers.  The algebraic integers in a finite extension field k of the rationals Q form a subring of k, called the ring of integers of k, a central object of study in algebraic number theory.

In this article, the term ring will be understood to mean commutative ring with a multiplicative identity.

Examples

Integral closure in algebraic number theory 
There are many examples of integral closure which can be found in algebraic number theory since it is fundamental for defining the ring of integers for an algebraic field extension  (or ).

Integral closure of integers in rationals 
Integers are the only elements of Q that are integral over Z. In other words, Z is the integral closure of Z in Q.

Quadratic extensions 
Typically this ring is denoted .

This example and the previous one are examples of quadratic integers. The integral closure of a quadratic extension  can be found by constructing the minimal polynomial of an arbitrary element  and finding number-theoretic criterion for the polynomial to have integral coefficients. This analysis can be found in the quadratic extensions article.

Roots of unity 
Let ζ be a root of unity. Then the integral closure of Z in the cyclotomic field Q(ζ) is Z[ζ]. This can be found by using the minimal polynomial and using Eisenstein's criterion.

Ring of algebraic integers 
The integral closure of Z in the field of complex numbers C, or the algebraic closure  is called the ring of algebraic integers.

Other 
The roots of unity, nilpotent elements and idempotent elements in any ring are integral over Z.

Integral closure in geometry 
In geometry, integral closure is closely related with normalization and normal schemes. It is the first step in resolution of singularities since it gives a process for resolving singularities of codimension 1.

They have a codimension 1 singularity along the -axis where they intersect.
Let a finite group G act on a ring A. Then A is integral over AG, the set of elements fixed by G; see Ring of invariants.
Let R be a ring and u a unit in a ring containing R. Then

u−1 is integral over R if and only if u−1 ∈ R[u].
 is integral over R.
The integral closure of the homogeneous coordinate ring of a normal projective variety X is the ring of sections

Integrality in algebra 

 If  is an algebraic closure of a field k, then  is integral over 
 The integral closure of C[[x]] in a finite extension of C((x)) is of the form  (cf. Puiseux series)

Equivalent definitions 
Let B be a ring, and let A be a subring of B. Given an element b in B, the following conditions are equivalent:
(i) b is integral over A;
(ii) the subring A[b] of B generated by A and b is a finitely generated A-module;
(iii) there exists a subring C of B containing A[b] and which is a finitely generated A-module;
(iv) there exists a faithful A[b]-module M such that M is finitely generated as an A-module.

The usual proof of this uses the following variant of the Cayley–Hamilton theorem on determinants:
Theorem Let u be an endomorphism of an A-module M generated by n elements and I an ideal of A such that . Then there is a relation:

This theorem (with I = A and u multiplication by b) gives (iv) ⇒ (i) and the rest is easy. Coincidentally, Nakayama's lemma is also an immediate consequence of this theorem.

Elementary properties

Integral closure forms a ring 
It follows from the above four equivalent statements that the set of elements of  that are integral over  forms a subring of  containing .

Transitivity of integrality 
Another consequence of the above equivalence is that "integrality" is transitive, in the following sense.

Integral closed in fraction field 
For example, the ring of integers  is integrally closed in the field .

Transitivity of integral closure with integrally closed domains 
Let A be an integral domain with the field of fractions K and A'  the integral closure of A in an algebraic field extension L of K. Then the field of fractions of A'  is L. In particular, A'  is an integrally closed domain.

Transitivity in algebraic number theory 
This situation is applicable in algebraic number theory when relating the ring of integers and a field extension.

Remarks 

If  is noetherian, transitivity of integrality can be weakened to the statement:

There exists a finitely generated -submodule of  that contains .

Relation with finiteness conditions 
Finally, the assumption that  be a subring of  can be modified a bit. In the same way one says  is finite ( finitely generated -module) or of finite type ( finitely generated -algebra). In this viewpoint, one has that

 is finite if and only if  is integral and of finite type.

Or more explicitly,

Integral extensions

Cohen-Seidenberg theorems 
An integral extension A ⊆ B has the going-up property, the lying over property, and the incomparability property (Cohen–Seidenberg theorems). In particular, the Krull dimensions of A and B are the same. Furthermore, if A is an integrally closed domain, then the going-down holds (see below).

In general, the going-up implies the lying-over. Thus, in the below, we simply say the "going-up" to mean "going-up" and "lying-over".

When A, B are domains such that B is integral over A, A is a field if and only if B is a field. As a corollary, one has: given a prime ideal  of B,  is a maximal ideal of B if and only if  is a maximal ideal of A. Another corollary: if L/K is an algebraic extension, then any subring of L containing K is a field.

Applications 
Let B be a ring that is integral over a subring A and k an algebraically closed field. If  is a homomorphism, then f extends to a homomorphism B → k. This follows from the going-up.

Geometric interpretation of going-up 
Let  be an integral extension of rings. Then the induced map

This is a geometric interpretation of the going-up.

Geometric interpretation of integral extensions 
Let B be a ring and A a subring that is a noetherian integrally closed domain (i.e.,  is a normal scheme.) The proof uses the notion of constructible sets. (See also: Torsor (algebraic geometry).)

Integrality, base-change, universally-closed, and geometry 
This leads to a geometric characterization of integral extension. Namely, let B be a ring with only finitely many minimal prime ideals (e.g., integral domain or noetherian ring). Then B is integral over a (subring) A if and only if  is closed for any A-algebra R. In particular, every proper map is universally closed.

Galois actions on integral extensions of integrally closed domains 

Proposition.

Proof. Suppose  for any  in G. Then, by prime avoidance, there is an element x in  such that  for any .

Application to algebraic number theory 
The Galois group  then acts on all of the prime ideals  lying over a fixed prime ideal . That is, if

then there is a Galois action on the set . This is called the Splitting of prime ideals in Galois extensions.

Remarks 
The same idea in the proof shows that if  is a purely inseparable extension (need not be normal), then  is bijective.

Let A, K, etc. as before but assume L is only a finite field extension of K. Then
(i)  has finite fibers.
(ii) the going-down holds between A and B: given , there exists  that contracts to it.
Indeed, in both statements, by enlarging L, we can assume L is a normal extension. Then (i) is immediate. By transitivity, there is  such that  and then  are the desired chain.

Integral closure 

Let A ⊂ B be rings and A'  the integral closure of A in B.  (See above for the definition.)

Integral closures behave nicely under various constructions.

The integral closure of a local ring A in, say, B, need not be local. (If this is the case, the ring is called unibranch.) This is the case for example when A is Henselian and B is a field extension of the field of fractions of A.

If A is a subring of a field K, then the integral closure of A in K is the intersection of all valuation rings of K containing A.

Let A be an -graded subring of an -graded ring B. Then the integral closure of A in B is an -graded subring of B.

There is also a concept of the integral closure of an ideal.
 
The radical of an ideal is integrally closed.

For noetherian rings, there are alternate definitions as well.

 if there exists a  not contained in any minimal prime, such that  for all .
 if in the normalized blow-up of I, the pull back of r is contained in the inverse image of I.  The blow-up of an ideal is an operation of schemes which replaces the given ideal with a principal ideal.  The normalization of a scheme is simply the scheme corresponding to the integral closure of all of its rings.

The notion of integral closure of an ideal is used in some proofs of the going-down theorem.

Conductor 

Explicitly,  consists of elements a in A such that . (cf. idealizer in abstract algebra.) It is the largest ideal of A that is also an ideal of B. If S is a multiplicatively closed subset of A, then
.
If B is a subring of the total ring of fractions of A, then we may identify
.

Example: Let k be a field and let  (i.e., A is the coordinate ring of the affine curve .) The conductor of A in B is the ideal .

Suppose B is the integral closure of an integral domain A in the field of fractions of A such that the A-module  is finitely generated.

Finiteness of integral closure 
An important but difficult question is on the finiteness of the integral closure of a finitely generated algebra. There are several known results.

The integral closure of a Dedekind domain in a finite extension of the field of fractions is a Dedekind domain; in particular, a noetherian ring. This is a consequence of the Krull–Akizuki theorem. In general, the integral closure of a noetherian domain of dimension at most 2 is noetherian; Nagata gave an example of dimension 3 noetherian domain whose integral closure is not noetherian. A nicer statement is this: the integral closure of a noetherian domain is a Krull domain (Mori–Nagata theorem). Nagata also gave an example of dimension 1 noetherian local domain such that the integral closure is not finite over that domain.

Let A be a noetherian integrally closed domain with field of fractions K. If L/K is a finite separable extension, then the integral closure  of A in L is a finitely generated A-module. This is easy and standard (uses the fact that the trace defines a non-degenerate bilinear form.)

Let A be a finitely generated algebra over a field k that is an integral domain with field of fractions K. If L is a finite extension of K, then the integral closure  of A in L is a finitely generated A-module and is also a finitely generated k-algebra. The result is due to Noether and can be shown using the Noether normalization lemma as follows. It is clear that it is enough to show the assertion when L/K is either separable or purely inseparable. The separable case is noted above, so assume L/K is purely inseparable. By the normalization lemma, A is integral over the polynomial ring . Hence,  is finite over S; a fortiori, over A. The result remains true if we replace k by Z.

The integral closure of a complete local noetherian domain A in a finite extension of the field of fractions of A is finite over A. More precisely, for a local noetherian ring R, we have the following chains of implications:
(i) A complete  A is a Nagata ring
(ii) A is a Nagata domain  A analytically unramified  the integral closure of the completion  is finite over   the integral closure of A is finite over A.

Noether's normalization lemma

Noether's normalisation lemma is a theorem in commutative algebra.  Given a field K and a finitely generated K-algebra A, the theorem says it is possible to find elements y1, y2, ..., ym in A that are algebraically independent over K such that A is finite (and hence integral) over B = K[y1,..., ym].  Thus the extension K ⊂ A can be written as a composite K ⊂ B ⊂ A where K ⊂ B is a purely transcendental extension and B ⊂ A is finite.

Integral morphisms
In algebraic geometry, a morphism  of schemes is integral if it is affine and if for some (equivalently, every) affine open cover  of Y, every map  is of the form  where A is an integral B-algebra. The class of integral morphisms is more general than the class of finite morphisms because there are integral extensions that are not finite, such as, in many cases, the algebraic closure of a field over the field.

Absolute integral closure 
Let A be an integral domain and L (some) algebraic closure of the field of fractions of A. Then the integral closure  of A in L is called the absolute integral closure of A. It is unique up to a non-canonical isomorphism. The ring of all algebraic integers is an example (and thus  is typically not noetherian).

See also 

 Normal scheme
 Noether normalization lemma
 Algebraic integer
Splitting of prime ideals in Galois extensions
Torsor (algebraic geometry)

Notes

References 
M. Atiyah, I.G. Macdonald, Introduction to Commutative Algebra, Addison–Wesley, 1994. 
Nicolas Bourbaki, Algèbre commutative, 2006.
 
 

 
 H. Matsumura Commutative ring theory. Translated from the Japanese by M. Reid. Second edition. Cambridge Studies in Advanced Mathematics, 8.
 J. S. Milne, "Algebraic number theory." available at http://www.jmilne.org/math/
 
 M. Reid, Undergraduate Commutative Algebra, London Mathematical Society, 29, Cambridge University Press, 1995.

Further reading 
Irena Swanson, Integral closures of ideals and rings
Do DG-algebras have any sensible notion of integral closure?

Commutative algebra
Ring theory
Algebraic structures